Tricholomopsis is a genus of fungi closely related to the large genus Tricholoma. Its best known member and type species is Tricholomopsis rutilans. The name means appearing like Tricholoma. The genus has a widespread distribution, and contains about 30 species. Tricholomopsis was described in 1939 by American mycologist Rolf Singer.

List of species
Tricholomopsis decora (Europe, North America)
Tricholomopsis bambusina (Japan)
Tricholomopsis flammula
Tricholomopsis flavissima (North America)
Tricholomopsis formosa (North America)
Tricholomopsis humboltii (Costa Rica, Colombia)
Tricholomopsis ornata
Tricholomopsis ornaticeps (New Zealand)
Tricholomopsis osiliensis (Estonia)
Tricholomopsis rutilans - Plums and Custard (Europe, North America, Australia)
Tricholomopsis scabra (New Zealand)
Tricholomopsis sulfureoides (North America)
Tricholomopsis totilivida (North America, Costa Rica)

See also

List of Tricholomataceae genera

References

External links

 
Tricholomataceae
Agaricales genera
Taxa named by Rolf Singer